Adelophagi (from the Greek terms ἄδηλος adelos "secretly," and φάγω phago "I eat") were a sect mentioned by the anonymous author known as Praedestinatus. They believed that a Christian ought to conceal himself from other men to take his nourishment, imagining that thus he imitated the Prophets. Members cited 1 Kings 13:8-9  and Ezekiel 24:17  as inspiration for their belief; it is unclear whether they excluded everyone or only members of other sects.  Philastrius suggests that they also rejected the divinity of the Holy Ghost. They seem to have flourished in the latter part of the fourth century, circa 350 AD.

References

Attribution

Former Christian denominations
Christian theological movements